Emerald Hill is a locality in New South Wales, Australia. In 2016 it had a population of 142 people.

References

Towns in New South Wales